Rainer Schüttler was the defending champion, but did not participate.

Seeds
All seeds receive a bye into the second round.

Draw

Finals

Top half

Section 1

Section 2

Bottom half

Section 3

Section 4

References
Draw
Qualifying Draw

2004 Japan Open Tennis Championships